Elgsnes Chapel is a chapel of the Church of Norway in Harstad Municipality in Troms og Finnmark county, Norway. It is located in the village of Elgsnes on the island of Hinnøya, just northwest of the town of Harstad. It is an annex chapel for the Trondenes parish which is part of the Trondenes prosti (deanery) in the Diocese of Nord-Hålogaland. The brown, wooden church was built in a long church style in 1985 using plans drawn up by the architect Ivar Tolo who was hired by Edvard Ruud. The church seats about 100 people.

The chapel was built as a memorial Hans Egede, the famous 17th-century missionary to Greenland who was from this part of Trondenes. As such, the chapel is often called  (Hans Egede's memorial).

See also
List of churches in Nord-Hålogaland

References

Harstad
Churches in Troms
Wooden churches in Norway
20th-century Church of Norway church buildings
Churches completed in 1985
1985 establishments in Norway
Long churches in Norway